Jonah Michael Bride (born December 27, 1995) is an American professional baseball infielder for the Oakland Athletics of Major League Baseball (MLB). He made his MLB debut in 2022.

Amateur career
Bride graduated from Owasso High School in Owasso, Oklahoma. He played college baseball at Neosho County Community College and the University of South Carolina. He was drafted by the Oakland Athletics in the 23rd round of the 2018 Major League Baseball draft.

Professional career
Bride signed with Oakland and made his professional debut with the Arizona League Athletics before being promoted to the Vermont Lake Monsters. Over 56 games between the two clubs, he batted .280 with three home runs and 34 RBIs. He spent the 2019 season with the Stockton Ports and Midland RockHounds, hitting .277 with ten home runs and 58 RBIs over 117 games. He did not play a minor league game in 2020 due to the cancellation of the season. In 2021, he played returned to Midland, slashing .265/.407/.424 with nine home runs and 49 RBIs over 78 games.

The Athletics added Bride to their 40-man roster after the 2021 season. He opened the 2022 season with the Las Vegas Aviators. The Athletics promoted him to the major leagues on June 14 and he made his MLB debut that night. He hit his first major league home run against Gerrit Cole of the New York Yankees on August 26.

Bride was optioned to Triple-A Las Vegas to begin the 2023 season.

References

External links

South Carolina Gamecocks bio

1995 births
Living people
People from Owasso, Oklahoma
Baseball players from Oklahoma
Major League Baseball infielders
Oakland Athletics players
Neosho County Panthers baseball players
South Carolina Gamecocks baseball players
Arizona League Athletics players
Vermont Lake Monsters players
Stockton Ports players
Midland RockHounds players
Mesa Solar Sox players
Las Vegas Aviators players
Waterloo Bucks players